Altona Correctional Facility is a medium security prison in New York in the United States.  The prison is in the Town of Altona in Clinton County.  As of 2010 Altona had a working capacity of 512.

History  
Altona Correctional Facility was built using the former Altona Central School building as the central administrative and school building. It wasn't uncommon for corrections officers  at the time of the prison's opening to have attended the school as children.

References

External links  
  NY prison information

Buildings and structures in Clinton County, New York
Prisons in New York (state)
1983 establishments in New York (state)